The Postal Services Act 2012, is a Malaysian laws which enacted to provide for the licensing of postal services and the regulation of the postal services industry, and for incidental or connected matters.

Structure
The Postal Services Act 2012, in its current form (9 February 2012), consists of 17 Parts containing 112 sections and 2 schedules (including no amendment).
 Part I: Preliminary
 Part II: Functions of the Commission
 Part III: Ministerial Powers and Procedures
 Part IV: Licensing Provision
 Part V: Provisions Relating to the Universal Service Licensee
 Part VI: General Terms and Conditions of Postal Services
 Part VII: Other Services
 Part VIII: Regulation of Rates
 Part IX: General Competition Practices
 Part X: Consumer Protection
 Part XI: Postcode and Addressing System and Postal Identifiers
 Part XII: Powers and Procedures of the Malaysian Communications and Multimedia Commission
 Chapter 1: Directions
 Chapter 2: Inquiry
 Chapter 3: Investigation
 Part XIII: Offences and Penalties
 Part XIV: Information Gathering Powers and Enforcement Provisions
 Chapter 1: Information gathering powers
 Chapter 2: Enforcement powers of authorized officer
 Chapter 3: Miscellaneous
 Part XV: General
 Part XVI: National Interest Matters
 Part XVII: Savings and Transitional
 Schedules

See also
Postal Services Act

References

External links
 Postal Services Act 2012 

2012 in Malaysian law
Malaysian federal legislation